Mahmoud Shabestari or Mahmūd Shabestarī (‎; 1288–1340) is one of the most celebrated Persian Sufi poets of the 14th century.

Life and work

Shabistari was born in the town of Shabestar near Tabriz in 1288 (687 AH), where he received his education. He became deeply versed in the symbolic terminology of Ibn Arabi. He wrote during a period of Mongol invasions.

His most famous work is a mystic text called The Secret Rose Garden (Gulshan-i Rāz) written about 1311 in rhyming couplets (Mathnawi). This poem was written in response to fifteen queries concerning Sufi metaphysics posed to "the Sufi literati of Tabriz" by Rukh Al Din Amir Husayn Harawi (d. 1318). It was also the main reference used by François Bernier when explaining Sufism to his European friends (in: Lettre sur le Quietisme des Indes; 1688)

Other works include The Book of Felicity (Sa'adat-nāma) and The Truth of Certainty about the Knowledge of the Lord of the Worlds (Ḥaqq al-yaqīn fi ma'rifat rabb al-'alamīn. The former is regarded as a relatively unknown poetic masterpiece written in khafif meter, while the later is his lone work of prose.

See also

Sufism
List of famous Sufis
List of Persian poets and authors

Notes

References
Leonard Lewisohn, Beyond Faith and Infidelity. Cruzon Press. 1995 
E.G. Browne, Literary History of Persia. (Four volumes, 2,256 pages, and twenty-five years in the writing). 1998. 
Jan Rypka, History of Iranian Literature. Reidel Publishing Company. 1968 . 
François Bernier, Lettre sur le Quiétisme des Indes in: Histoire des Ouvrages des Savans, Henri Basnage de Beauval (ed.), September 1688.

External links

www.poetry-chaikhana.com
www.phanes.com
www.poetseers.org
 
 

1288 births
1320s deaths
Iranian Sufis
Sufi poets
13th-century Iranian people
14th-century Iranian people
13th-century Persian-language poets
14th-century Persian-language poets
People from Shabestar
Ilkhanate-period poets
Ancient Persian mystical literature